The NAPA 150 was a NASCAR K&N Pro Series East race held at Columbus Motor Speedway from 2011 to 2016. The race was discontinued after the speedway closed in 2016.

History
The first NASCAR K&N Pro Series East race at Columbus was held in 2011, and Darrell Wallace Jr. won the inaugural event. The 2016 running was the last, as Columbus closed after the 2016 season.

Past winners

References

External links
 http://hometracks.nascar.com/tracks/Columbus
 

ARCA Menards Series East
Former NASCAR races
2011 establishments in Ohio
2016 disestablishments in Ohio